Adv K. Raju is an Indian politician and the previous Minister of Forests, Wildlife Protection, Animal husbandry, Dairy Development, Milk- Co-operatives, Zoos  of Kerala Legislative Assembly. He belongs to Communist Party of India and represents Punalur constituency. He was previously elected to the Assembly in 2006 and 2011.

Positions held

 State Vice-President, Library Council  (1995-2005)
 Member, Yeroor Panchayat (5 Years) 
 Chairman, Standing Committee, District Panchayat, Kollam
 Member, Scheduled Tribe State Advisory Committee, Forest-Wildlife State Advisory Committee
 Member, General Council, Advanced Legal University, Cochin
 State Council Member, CPI
 National Executive Committee Member and State Secretary, Bharathiya Karshaka Thozhilali Union.

Personal life

He is the son of G. Karunakaran and Pankajakshy. He was born on 10 April 1953 at Nettayam-Yeroor. He is a lawyer by profession. He is married to B. Sheeba and has two sons Nithin Raj and Rithik Raj. He lives in Anchal, Kollam.

References

Members of the Kerala Legislative Assembly
Communist Party of India politicians from Kerala
People from Kollam district
Living people
1953 births